TWRP (pronounced twerp), formerly known as Tupper Ware Remix Party, is a Canadian rock band originally from Halifax, Nova Scotia. Initially founded in 2007, the band moved to Toronto in 2011 with a change in members and musical direction. Their lineup consists of keyboardist and vocalist Doctor Sung, guitarist Lord Phobos, bassist Commander Meouch, and drummer Havve Hogan.

The band always performs in full costume, with their faces and real names unknown; they also have a fictional band history, involving Doctor Sung finding his bandmates through space and time. TWRP released their first album, Poised to Dominate, in 2010. It was followed by The Device (2012),
Ladyworld (2017), Together Through Time (2018), Return to Wherever (2019), Over the Top (2020), and New & Improved (2021). They have also released six EPs.

They are also known for their collaborations with Ninja Sex Party, having become their opening act and backing band in 2015 on both live performances and studio releases, starting with the album Under the Covers. They are also the backing band on The TryForce, the third album of Starbomb, another band featuring the members of Ninja Sex Party.

On 17 September 2018, TWRP appeared on Conan as the backing band for Ninja Sex Party, in a clean version of "Danny Don't You Know".

Members 

Band members
 Doctor Sung – keytar, keyboards, talk box & vocals, percussion (2007–present) 
 Havve Hogan – drums, electronic percussion (2007–present)
 Lord Phobos – lead guitar, acoustic guitar (2011–present)
 Commander Meouch – bass, backing vocals (2011, 2012–present), keyboards, talk box (2012)

Former members
 Stone LaChismo – bass (2007–2011)
 Bombustron – guitar, vocals, tambourine, electronic percussion, keyboard (2007–2011, 2011, 2012–2014)
 Atomicawk Startrotter – bass (2011–2012)

Timeline

Discography

Studio albums 
 Poised to Dominate (2010)
 Ladyworld (2017)
Together Through Time (2018)
 Return to Wherever (2019)
 Over the Top (2020)
 New & Improved (2021)

Compilation albums 
 Omnibus (2017)
 Welcome to TWRP (2018)
 Lil' Shiny Tunes Vol. 1 (2021)

EPs 
 Sex Is a Machine That Likes to Dance (2007)
 The Device (2012)
 2nite (2015)
 Believe in Your Dreams (2015)
 Guardians of the Zone (2016)

Singles 
 "LazerHorse" (2011)
 "Only the Best" (2020)
 "Need Each Other" (2020) 
 "Bright Blue Sky" (2021) 
 "Found Your Love" (2021) 
 "Polygon" (2021) 
 "Eve Of The War" (2022)

As Ninja Sex Party's backing band 
 Under the Covers (2016)
 Under the Covers, Vol. II (2017)
 Cool Patrol (2018)
 Under the Covers, Vol. III (2019)
 The Prophecy (2020)
 Level Up (2021)

As Starbomb's backing band 
 The TryForce (2019)

Guest appearances  
 Planet Booty – "Only If You Say Yes" (2021)

Notes

References

External links 
 

Musical quartets
Synthwave groups
Canadian electronic rock musical groups
Canadian synthpop groups
Canadian alternative rock groups
Musical groups established in 2006
Musical groups from Halifax, Nova Scotia
Musical groups from Toronto
Masked musicians
Bands with fictional stage personas 
Ninja Sex Party
2006 establishments in Nova Scotia